"Oldest language" may refer to:
the emergence of language itself in human evolution
origin of language
proto-language, a stage before the emergence of language proper
mythical origins of language
a Proto-Human language, the hypothetical, most recent common ancestor of all the world's languages
the date of attestation in writing (epigraphy). 
see list of languages by first written accounts.
the conservative nature of a given language (low rate of language change, viz. "old" in the sense of "has not changed much for a long time"), see
glottochronology
historical linguistics